Kinglake is a town in Victoria, Australia,  north-east of Melbourne's Central Business District, located within the Shires of Murrindindi and Nillumbik local government areas. Kinglake recorded a population of 1,662 at the 2021 census.

The town was one of the worst affected during the Black Saturday bushfires in 2009.

Location
Many areas of Kinglake overlook the Melbourne skyline to the south west and the Yarra Valley wineries to the south, with views of Port Phillip Bay south of Melbourne possible on clear days. Kinglake is generally  colder than Metropolitan Melbourne, with the summers being very pleasant and heavy frosts and occasional snowfalls during winter.

History
Gold was discovered in 1861 on Mount Slide to the east of the locality at an area which became known as Mountain Rush. A Mountain Rush Post Office opened on 7 May 1862, but closed in January 1863 as the miners moved to other locations.

Kinglake township was established much later and was named after British historian Alexander William Kinglake, whose eight-volume history of the Crimean War had recently been completed.

Kinglake Post Office opened on 14 May 1883. There was also an office at Kinglake East open from 1914 until 1950.

Population
In the 2016 Census, there were 1,536 people in Kinglake. 82.9% of people were born in Australia and 89.9% of people spoke only English at home. The most common responses for religion were "No Religion" 48.5% and Catholic 15.0%.

Education
Education options that are available to Kinglake residents include the state secondary schools Whittlesea Secondary College and Yea High School. Private secondary schools are also available via numerous bus services that service the township. Primary schools include Kinglake Primary, Middle Kinglake and Kinglake West Primary.

Sporting teams
The local Australian Rules football / netball club, known as 'The Lakers', plays in Division 2 of the Yarra Valley Mountain District Football League.

There is also a representative Basketball team that plays in the VJBL (Victorian Junior Basketball Leagues), under the Kinglake Basketball Club's guidance. These teams are also known as 'The Lakers'.

Community groups

The Kinglake Ranges have a large number of Community Groups:

Kinglake Ranges Foundation 
Rotary Club of Kinglake Ranges
Kinglake Ranges Kinglake Ranges Neighbourhood House
Kinglake Ranges Mens Shed
Kinglake Action Network Development Organisation
FireFoxes Australia
Bollygum Park
Country Women's Association Kinglake
Kinglake Boomerang Bags
Lion's Club Kinglake
Kinglake Ranges Business Network
Kinglake Ranges Visual & Performing Arts Alliance
Ellimatta Youth - Youth Services for the Kinglake Ranges
Kinglake Landcare Group

Media
The Kinglake Ranges have several points for information and advertising. Two are community-run not for profit organisations:  Kinglake Ranges Radio (UGFM) 94.5FM as part of the Upper Goulburn FM Community Radio Network;  and printed every month is the Mountain Monthly - The Ranges News, established in 1981.

UGFM
Mountain Monthly - The Ranges News
The Local Paper is the area's free weekly newspaper, produced and edited by the Eltham-based Ash Long.

Bushfires

Kinglake has a long history of bushfires when extreme weather conditions occur. The CFA, DSE Victoria and NSW firefighters managed to bring the fire to a halt. Fires also occurred in the 1982–1983 season and during the 1960s. The major fires of 1939 also placed the community at risk with a major ignition point being nearby. In 1926 major fires in the area caused significant losses; the Post Office being the only building left standing.

2009 bushfire

Kinglake was one of the main affected towns in the Black Saturday bushfires, with 38 people confirmed dead in Kinglake and Kinglake West, and more than 500 homes destroyed. Local resident and former GTV-9 newsreader Brian Naylor and his wife Moiree were confirmed to be amongst the dead. Not long after news reports had stated that the fire went through the whole town, Deputy Police Commissioner of Victoria Kieran Walshe revealed that six of the victims had been in the same car.

The cause of the Kilmore East-Kinglake bushfire was found by the 2009 Victorian Bushfires Royal Commission to be an ageing power line owned by SP AusNet, an energy distribution company. In December 2014 Victoria's Supreme Court approved an  settlement of a legal class action against SP AusNet, and Utility Services Group. It has been noted as being "the biggest class action settlement in Australian legal history". The previous highest payout was $200 Million in Kirby v Centro Properties Limited (No 6) [2012] FCA 650 (19 June 2012).

Books on Kinglake 
Stewart, Kath and Hawkins, Deidre Living with Fire: A brief history of fires in the Kinglake Ranges, Kinglake, Vic. Kinglake Historical Society, 2019 

O'Connor, Jane. "Without Warning: One woman's story of surviving Black Saturday", Prahan, Vic. Hardie Grant Books, 2010

See also
 Shire of Eltham – Kinglake was previously within this former local government area.
 Shire of Yea – Kinglake was previously within this former local government area.
 City of Whittlesea - part of Kinglake West was and some parts still are
in this current local government area.

References

External links

 Photographs of Kinglake fire 2009
 Mountain Monthly - The Ranges News

Towns in Victoria (Australia)
Shire of Murrindindi
1862 establishments in Australia
Shire of Nillumbik